HMS Bootle was a Hunt class minesweeper of the Royal Navy from World War I. She was originally to be named Buckie, but this was changed to avoid any conflict between the vessel name and a coastal location.

See also
 Bootle, Lancashire

References
 

 

Hunt-class minesweepers (1916)
1918 ships